Khaled El Sayed is a Lebanese actor and voice actor.

Filmography

Film

Television

Plays 
Waylon Le Omma. - Sergeant 2013
I Reached the 99. 2008

Dubbing roles 

 1001 Nights
 Alfred J. Kwak
 Alice in Wonderland (1951 film) - Walrus (Classical Arabic version)
 Arabian Nights: Sinbad's Adventures
 Astroganger - Ganger
Batman & Mr. Freeze: SubZero - Dr. Gregory Belson
 Bolt (2008 film) - Dr. Calico (Classical Arabic version)
 The Bush Baby
 Chōdenji Robo Combattler V
 Courage the Cowardly Dog
 The Cramp Twins
 Dexter's Laboratory (Image Production House version)
 Dot and Keeto
 The Great Mouse Detective - Major Dr. David Q. Dawson (Classical Arabic version)
 Haikara-san ga Tōru
 Hello! Sandybell
 Huckleberry Finn Monogatari
 Igano Kabamaru - Shirakawa, Saizō Igano 
 Mokhtarnameh - Abd Allah ibn al-Zubayr
 Manga Aesop Monogatari
 Manga Hajimete Monogatari
 Manga Sarutobi Sasuke
 Les Misérables (1992)
 Monsters, Inc. - Henry J. Waternoose III (Classical Arabic version)
 The Men of Angelos
 The Mysterious Cities of Gold
 The New Adventures of Gigantor
 Ohayō! Spank
 Planes - Chug
 Planes: Fire & Rescue - Chug
 Plawres Sanshiro
 The Powerpuff Girls - Mojo Jojo (Image Production House version)
The Powerpuff Girls (2016 TV series) - Mojo Jojo
 Prophet Joseph - Amenhotep III
 Ratatouille - Auguste Gusteau (Classical Arabic version)
 Rated A for Awesome - Max Awesome
 Robin Hood (1973 film) - Friar Tuck (Classical Arabic version)
 Saint Mary
 Salad Juyushi Tomatoman
 Thumbelina: A Magical Story
 Time Travel Tondekeman
 Tokimeki Tonight - Mori Eto (Ranze's father)
 Tom and Jerry Tales - Spike
 Treasure Planet - Mr. Arrow (Classical Arabic version)
 Up (2009 film) - Gamma (Classical Arabic version)
 Xiaolin Showdown - Dojo Kanojo Cho
 Thomas & Friends

References

External links 

 

Lebanese male actors
Lebanese male voice actors
Year of birth missing (living people)
Living people
Lebanese male film actors
Lebanese male television actors
20th-century Lebanese male actors
21st-century Lebanese male actors